Folate receptor 1 (Folate receptor alpha, FOLR1) is a protein that in humans is encoded by the FOLR1 gene.

The protein encoded by this gene is a member of the folate receptor (FOLR) family. Members of this family have a high affinity for folic acid and for several reduced folic acid derivatives, and mediate delivery of 5-methyltetrahydrofolate to the interior of cells.

Functions 
This receptor is responsible for binding to folic acid and its derivatives, which becomes crucial during fetal development. By adding folate supplementation during pregnancy, neural tube defects in the fetus are prevented. Folate derivatives are necessary for important metabolic processes such as DNA, protein and lipid methylation. More importantly, folate plays a major role in DNA replication and cell division, which are common characteristics of rapid growth. Even though it is unclear how folate affects neural tube formation, scientists are certain that without appropriate folate levels, neural tube defects can develop through human and mice studies. Neural tube defects refer to the improper development of the neural tube by not being sealed correctly. This results in exencephaly or spina bifida, both nervous system abnormalities.

This gene is composed of 7 exons; exons 1 through 4 encode the 5' UTR and exons 4 through 7 encode the open reading frame. Due to the presence of 2 promoters, multiple transcription start sites, and alternative splicing of exons, several transcript variants are derived from this gene. These variants differ in the lengths of 5' and 3' UTR, but they encode an identical amino acid sequence.

Clinical significance

FRα, due to its high expression in some tumors,  is an attractive therapeutic target for the development of novel anti-cancer agents in order to limit toxic side-effects on off-target tissues.

FRa can be overexpressed by a number of epithelial-derived tumors including ovarian, breast, renal, lung, colorectal, and brain. According to a review published in 2020, elevated expression of FRa was noted in mesotheliomas (72-100% of cases), triple-negative breast cancer (35-68% of cases) and epithelial ovarian cancer (76-89% of cases).

Therefore, antibodies to FRa are being developed for use in targeted therapies, with one example being farletuzumab, in a phase III trial for ovarian cancer. Further, FRa-binding markers have been created in an attempt to visualise FRa-expressing tumors. In 2021, the fluorescent marker pafolacianine was approved for identification of malignant lesions during surgeries.

Autoantibodies to the FRA have been linked to neurodevelopmental diseases, particularly cerebral folate deficiency schizophrenia and autism spectrum disorder. Recent studies have shown that these neurodevelopmental disorders can be treated with folinic acid.

Figures

See also 
 SLC19A1
 ONX-0801

References

Further reading